Presence service is a network service which accepts, stores and distributes presence information.

Presence service may be implemented as a single server or have an internal structure involving multiple servers and proxies. There may be complex patterns of redirection and proxying while retaining logical connectivity to a single presence service. Also presence service may be implemented as direct communication among presentity and watchers, i.e. server is not required.

Functional entities to support presence service

Presence server
The Presence Server, that reside in the presentity's home network, is able to receive and manage presence information.  It is a SIP Application Server and is located using SIP URLs.

See also
Unified communications

References
Day, M., J. Rosenberg, and H. Sugano. "A Model for Presence and Instant Messaging." RFC 2778. February 2000.
TS 23.141
Open Mobile Alliance - Presence Enabler 

Computer networking